An ecclesiastical new moon is the first day of a lunar month (an ecclesiastical moon) in an ecclesiastical lunar calendar. Such months have a whole number of days, 29 or 30, whereas true synodic months can vary from about 29.27 to 29.83 days in length. Medieval authors equated the ecclesiastical new moon with a new crescent moon, but it is not a phase of the true moon. If the ecclesiastical lunar calendar is accurate, the ecclesiastical new moon can be any day from the day of the astronomical new moon or dark moon to two days later (see table). The ecclesiastical calendar valid for the Julian and Gregorian calendar are described in detail by Grotefend, Ginzel and in the Explanatory Supplement to The Astronomical Ephemeris.

The ecclesiastical new moon which falls on or next after March 8 is of special importance, since it is the paschal new moon that begins the paschal lunar month (see table). The fourteenth day of the same lunar month is the first of the calendar year to occur on or next after March 21. This fourteenth day was called the paschal full moon by medieval computists. Easter is the following Sunday.

Calendar pages in medieval liturgical books indicated the ecclesiastical new moons by writing the Golden Number to the left of the day of the month on which the ecclesiastical new moon would occur in the year of that Golden Number.   In some places the age of the moon was announced daily in the office of  Prime at the reading of the  martyrology. 

When in the 13th century Roger Bacon complained about the discrepancy between the ecclesiastical moon and the observed lunar phases, he specifically mentioned the discrepancy involving the ecclesiastical new moon  Quilibet computista novit quod fallit primatio per tres dies vel quatuor his temporibus; et quilibet rusticus potest in coelo hunc errorem contemplari. (Any computist knows that the prime [of the moon] is off  by three or four days in our time; and any rustic can see this error in the sky.)
These complaints were finally addressed by the construction of the Gregorian calendar. 

A check can be made on the difference between the astronomical new moon and the ecclesiastical new moon. The following table gives a comparison for 2010. All times are Greenwich Mean Time. Coordinated Universal Time is the same with a tolerance of 0.9 seconds either way.

The long term accuracy of the Gregorian ecclesiastical lunar calendar is remarkable. It will be in error by one day in about 73 500 years while the error with respect to the tropical year will be one day in about 3320 years.

The following table gives the ecclesiastical new moon used for determining Easter (in the Gregorian system) for a range of years.

References

External links
U.S. Naval Observatory Data Services
Gregorian ecclesiastical new moons
Oxford, Bodleian Library MS. Lat. liturg. e. 6. (14th century)

Easter date
New moon